5 * Stunna (stylized as 5 ★ Stunna, also known as 5 Star Stunna) is the third studio album by American rapper Birdman. It was released on December 11, 2007, by Cash Money Records and Universal Motown Records. The album includes the productions from Kane Beatz, T-Mix, Cool & Dre, Young Yonny, DJ Tone, the Fliptones, Tommy Gunnz, Drumma Boy, Steve Morales and Raymond "Sarom" Diaz, among others. Rapper Lil Wayne has featured 7 out of 22 tracks throughout the whole album. The album debuted at number 18 on the US Billboard 200, selling 80,000 copies in the first week. To date, the album has sold 372,000 copies in the United States.

All three singles were released from the album, and each of them contains the collaborations with Lil Wayne; "Pop Bottles", which also features guest vocals from fellow rapper Jadakiss, "100 Million", which also features guest vocals from these fellow rappers Young Jeezy and Rick Ross, along with these record producers Dré and DJ Khaled, "I Run This".

Background
The album was first rumored to be titled as 5 Star General, however, the title of the album was later changed into 5 Star Stunna.

Singles
His official debut single for his third album, titled "Pop Bottles" was released on June 15, 2007. The song features guest vocals from his frequent collaborator and fellow rapper Lil Wayne, while it was produced by Raymond "Sarom" Diaz and Steve Morales.

The album's second single, titled "100 Million" was released on November 23, 2007. Lil Wayne also featured on this track, along with fellow rappers Young Jeezy and Rick Ross, and these record producers Dré and DJ Khaled. The song was produced by the production duo Cool & Dre.

The album's third single, "I Run This" was released on May 14, 2008. For the third time, Lil Wayne was featured on this track, while it was produced by T-Mix and Drumma Boy.

Lawsuits
In October 2009, Birdman, Lil Wayne, Cash Money Records, and various music distribution outlets were sued for copyright infringement by Thomas Marasciullo, who claims his voice was used without permission. The rappers asked him to record some "Italian-styled spoken word recordings" in 2006. The lyrics were allegedly used on "Respect", and other tracks from the rappers' collaboration album Like Father, Like Son.

Track listing 
Credits adapted from the album's liner notes.

Sample credits
 "Pop Bottles" contains interpolations from "Put Ya Hands Up", written by Wayne Brown, Shandel Green, Jason Phillips, and Deke Richards.

Charts

Weekly charts

Year-end charts

References

2007 albums
Birdman (rapper) albums
Albums produced by Cool & Dre
Albums produced by Drumma Boy
Albums produced by Honorable C.N.O.T.E.
Albums produced by Jeff Bhasker
Albums produced by Kane Beatz
Albums produced by Jim Jonsin
Cash Money Records albums